Howard is a common English surname. One source for this surname is with the Gaelic names Ó hOghartaigh and Ó hIomhair. Other origins also exist. The dominant theory pertains to the French personal names Huard and Houard adapted after the Norman Conquest of 1066. It is from a Germanic source similar to Old High German *Hugihard "heart-brave," or *Hoh-ward, literally "high defender; chief guardian." Also probably in some cases a confusion with cognate Anglo-Scandinavian personal name Haward from Hávarðr, which means ha(r) "high" (or hǫð "battle") and element varðr, meaning "guardian", and sometimes also with unrelated Hayward. In some rare cases from Old English eowu hierde "ewe herd." In Anglo-Norman the French digramm -ou- was often rendered as -ow- such as couard → coward, tour → tower, flour (western variant form of fleur) → flower, etc (two last examples with svarabakhti, typical of the Anglo-Norman language). The first public record of the surname is dated 1221 in Cambridgeshire. There are several variant surname spellings.

People with the surname Howard include:

Disambiguation pages
 Alan Howard (disambiguation), various people
 Anna Howard (disambiguation), various people
 Anne, or Ann, Howard (disambiguation), various people
 Ben Howard (disambiguation), various people
 Charles Howard (disambiguation), various people
 Chris Howard (disambiguation), various people
 Daniel Howard (disambiguation), various people
 David Howard, various people
 Edward Howard (disambiguation), various people
 Frank Howard (disambiguation), various people
 George Howard (disambiguation), various people
 Jack Howard (disambiguation), various people
 James Howard (disambiguation), various people
 John Howard, various people
 Ken Howard, various people
 Leslie Howard, various people
 Paul Howard (disambiguation), various people
 Randy Howard (disambiguation), various people
 Robert Howard (disambiguation), various people
 Ronald Howard (disambiguation), various people
 Sara Howard (disambiguation), various people
 Scott Howard (disambiguation), various people
 Stephen Howard (disambiguation), various people
 Ted Howard (disambiguation), various people
 Thomas Howard (disambiguation), various people
 Tim Howard (disambiguation), various people

Aristocracy and royalty
 Members of the English aristocratic Howard family
 Catherine Howard, fifth wife of Henry VIII of England

Arts and music
 Alan Howard (actor) (1937–2015), British actor
 Arliss Howard (born 1954), American actor, writer, director
 Barbara Howard (artist) (1926–2002), Canadian artist and wood-engraver
 Billy Howard, English comedian
 Bryce Dallas Howard (born 1981), American actress, daughter of Ron Howard
 Cecil de Blaquiere Howard (1888–1956), American sculptor
 Charlton Howard (born 2003), Australian rapper, singer, and songwriter, known professionally as the Kid Laroi
 Clayton Howard (1934–2017), British make-up artist
 Clint Howard (born 1959), American actor, brother of Ron
 Constance Howard (artist) (1910–2000), British textile artist
 Curly Howard (1903–1952), American actor, member of the Three Stooges
 Deborah Howard (born 1946), British art historian, architectural historian, and academic
 Dominic Howard (born 1977), English drummer
 Emily Howard (born 1979) British composer and chess player
 Frank Ernest Howard, English architect, generally known as F.E. Howard
 Gertrude Howard (1892–1934), American actress
 Henry Howard (1769-1847), British artist
 Jan Howard (1929–2020), American country music singer-songwriter
 Maurice Howard, British art historian
 Miki Howard (born 1960), American jazz singer
 Moe Howard (1897–1975), American actor, member of the Three Stooges
 Rance Howard (1928–2017), American actor
 Ron Howard (born 1954), American actor and film director
 Russell Howard (born 1980), English comedian
 Shawn Michael Howard (born 1969), American actor
 Shemp Howard (1895–1955), American actor, member of the Three Stooges
 Sophie Howard (born 1983), British model
 Terrence Howard (born 1969), American actor
 Traylor Howard (born 1966), American actress
 Trevor Howard, (1913–1987), English actor

Literature and journalism
 Blanche Willis Howard (1847–1898), American author
 Elizabeth Jane Howard (1923–2014), English novelist
 Gorges Edmond Howard (1715–1786) Irish legal and literary writer
 Jane Howard, (1935–1996), journalist known for her work at Life magazine
 J. J. Howard (born 1972), American author 
 Keble Howard (1875–1928), English comic author
 Madeline Howard (born 1949), American fantasy author

Military
 Benjamin Howard (Missouri politician) U.S. military officer
 Curtis W. Howard (1917–1942), U.S. Navy officer and Navy Cross recipient
 Hugh W. Howard, U.S. Navy admiral
 John Howard (1912–1999), British Army officer who led the glider-born operation that opened D-Day in 1944
 John Martin Howard (1917-1942), U.S. Navy officer
 Michelle J. Howard (born 1960), American Navy admiral
 Oliver O. Howard (1830–1909), General in the U.S. Civil War

Politics and law
 Asher Howard (19877-1945), American lawyer ND POLITICIAN
 Benjamin Chew Howard American politician
 Carlos Howard, Governor of West Florida
 Daniel Edward Howard (1861–1935), president of Liberia
 Edgar Howard (1858–1951), American politician
 Grace Schneiders-Howard (1869–1968), Surinamese social worker and politician
 Jerry Thomas Howard (born 1936), American politician
 Julia C. Howard, American politician
 Marilyn Howard (1939–2020), American educator and politician
 Michael Howard (formerly Hecht) (born 1941), British Conservative politician
 Milford W. Howard (1862–1937), American politician
 Perry Wilbon Howard (1877–1961), Republican attorney and African American civil rights activist from Mississippi
 Raymond Howard (politician), American politician, Missouri senator
 T. R. M. Howard (1908–1976), Afro American civil rights leader
 Vernon Edgar Howard, (1937–1998), American politician
 William Jordan Howard (1799–1862), Mayor of Pittsburgh, Pennsylvania
 William Lorenzo Howard (1921–1994), Mayor of Monroe, Louisiana; partner of Howard Brothers Discount Stores

Sciences and mathematics
 Henry Eliot Howard (1873–1940), English amateur ornithologist
 Harvey J. Howard (1880–1956), American ophthalmologist
 Luke Howard (1772–1864), British chemist and meteorologist
 Leland Ossian Howard (1857–1950), American entomologist
 William Alvin Howard (born 1926), American mathematician

Sports
 Barbara Howard (1920–2017), Canadian sprinter
 Billy Howard (gridiron football) (born 1950), American football player
 Bug Howard (born 1994), American football player
 Chaunte Howard (born 1984), American high jumper
 Desmond Howard (born 1970), American football player
 Dwight Howard (born 1985), American basketball player
 Elston Howard (1929–1980), American baseball player
 George Howard (footballer), Australian footballer
 Harvey Howard, British rugby league footballer
 Isaac Howard (born 2004), American ice hockey player
 Jay Howard (born 1981), British race car driver
 Jett Howard (born 2003), American basketball player
 Jimmy Howard (born 1984), American ice hockey goaltender
 Jordan Howard (born 1994), American football player
 Josh Howard (born 1980), American basketball player
 Juwan Howard (born 1973), American basketball player
 Malcolm Howard (rower), Canadian rower
 Mark Howard (footballer, born January 1986), English former footballer and manager
 Mark Howard (footballer, born September 1986), English footballer
 Markus Howard (born 1999), American basketball player
 Matt Howard (born 1989), American basketball player
 Matt Howard (baseball) (born 1967), American baseball player
 O. J. Howard (born 1994), American football player
 Pat Howard (footballer) (born 1947), English footballer
 Pat Howard (born 1973), Australia rugby team head coach
 Red Howard (1900–1973), American football player 
 Rhyne Howard (born 2000), American basketball player
 Ryan Howard (born 1979), American baseball player
 Sam Howard (born 1993), American baseball player
 Sophie Howard (born 1993), Scottish footballer
 Spencer Howard (born 1996), American professional baseball player
 Tim Howard (born 1979), American soccer player
 Tim Howard (field hockey) (born 1996), Australian field hockey player
 Travin Howard (born 1996), American football player
 Tytus Howard (born 1996), American football player
 Xavien Howard (born 1993), American football player

Other
 Ada Howard (1829–1907), first president of Wellesley College
 Alan Howard (hedge fund manager) (born September 1963), British hedge fund manager
 Ebenezer Howard (1850–1928), British urban planner and founder of the garden city movement
 Peggy Chew Howard (1760–1824), First Lady of Maryland

See also 
 Heward

References

English-language surnames